OpenLR is a royalty-free open standard for "procedures and formats for the encoding, transmission, and decoding of local data irrespective of the map" developed by TomTom.

The format allows locations localised on one map to be found on another map to which the data have been transferred.

OpenLR requires that the coordinates are specified in the WGS 84 format and that route links are given in metres. Also, all routes need to be assigned to a "functional road class".

The specification is described in a white paper licensed under a Creative Commons license. Additionally, TomTom has published an open-source library for the format under the Apache license.

See also
 Traffic Message Channel
 GPS
 Point of Interest

References

External links
OpenLR - Open, Compact and Royalty-free Dynamic Location Referencing

Open formats
Geographic data and information
GIS vector file formats